Alexie can be either a surname or given name. Notable people with the name include:

Surname
 Robert Arthur Alexie (1957–2014), Canadian First Nations novelist and land claim negotiator
 Sherman Alexie (born 1966), American poet, writer, and filmmaker

Given name
 Alexie Gilmore (born 1976), American actress 
 Alexie Glass-Kantor, Australian curator and writer

See also
 Alexy
 Alexey
 Aleksy